Pervomaysky is a rural locality (a settlement) in Gmelinskoye Rural Settlement, Staropoltavsky District, Volgograd Oblast, Russia. The population was 313 as of 2010. There are 7 streets.

Geography 
Pervomaysky is located in steppe, 41 km southeast of Staraya Poltavka (the district's administrative centre) by road. Gmelinka is the nearest rural locality.

References 

Rural localities in Staropoltavsky District